In geometry and physics, spinors  are elements of a complex vector space that can be associated with Euclidean space. Like geometric vectors and more general tensors, spinors transform linearly when the Euclidean space is subjected to a  slight (infinitesimal) rotation. Unlike vectors and tensors,  a spinor transforms to its negative when the space is continuously rotated through a complete turn from 0° to 360° (see picture). This property characterizes spinors: spinors can be viewed as the "square roots" of vectors (although this is inaccurate and may be misleading; they are better viewed as "square roots" of sections of vector bundles – in the case of the exterior algebra bundle of the cotangent bundle, they thus become "square roots" of differential forms).

It is also possible to associate a substantially similar notion of spinor to Minkowski space, in which case the Lorentz transformations of special relativity play the role of rotations. Spinors were introduced in geometry by Élie Cartan in 1913. In the 1920s physicists discovered that spinors are essential to describe the intrinsic angular momentum, or "spin", of the electron and other subatomic particles.

Spinors are characterized by the specific way in which they behave under rotations. They change in different ways depending not just on the overall final rotation, but the details of how that rotation was achieved (by a continuous path in the rotation group). There are two topologically distinguishable classes (homotopy classes) of paths through rotations that result in the same overall rotation, as illustrated by the belt trick puzzle. These two inequivalent classes yield spinor transformations of opposite sign. The spin group is the group of all rotations keeping track of the class. It doubly covers the rotation group, since each rotation can be obtained in two inequivalent ways as the endpoint of a path. The space of spinors by definition is equipped with a (complex) linear representation of the spin group, meaning that elements of the spin group act as linear transformations on the space of spinors, in a way that genuinely depends on the homotopy class. In mathematical terms, spinors are described by a double-valued projective representation of the rotation group SO(3).

Although spinors can be defined purely as elements of a representation space of the spin group (or its Lie algebra of infinitesimal rotations), they are typically defined as elements of a vector space that carries a linear representation of the Clifford algebra. The Clifford algebra is an associative algebra that can be constructed from Euclidean space and its inner product in a basis-independent way. Both the spin group and its Lie algebra are embedded inside the Clifford algebra in a natural way, and in applications the Clifford algebra is often the easiest to work with. A Clifford space operates on a spinor space, and the elements of a spinor space are spinors. After choosing an orthonormal basis of Euclidean space, a representation of the Clifford algebra is generated by gamma matrices, matrices that satisfy a set of canonical anti-commutation relations. The spinors are the column vectors on which these matrices act. In three Euclidean dimensions, for instance, the Pauli spin matrices are a set of gamma matrices, and the two-component complex column vectors on which these matrices act are spinors. However, the particular matrix representation of the Clifford algebra, hence what precisely constitutes a "column vector" (or spinor), involves the choice of basis and gamma matrices in an essential way. As a representation of the spin group, this realization of spinors as (complex) column vectors will either be irreducible if the dimension is odd, or it will decompose into a pair of so-called "half-spin" or Weyl representations if the dimension is even.

Introduction 

What characterizes spinors and distinguishes them from geometric vectors and other tensors is subtle. Consider applying a rotation to the coordinates of a system. No object in the system itself has moved, only the coordinates have, so there will always be a compensating change in those coordinate values when applied to any object of the system. Geometrical vectors, for example, have components that will undergo the same rotation as the coordinates. More broadly, any tensor associated with the system (for instance, the stress of some medium) also has coordinate descriptions that adjust to compensate for changes to the coordinate system itself.

Spinors do not appear at this level of the description of a physical system, when one is concerned only with the properties of a single isolated rotation of the coordinates. Rather, spinors appear when we imagine that instead of a single rotation, the coordinate system is gradually (continuously) rotated between some initial and final configuration. For any of the familiar and intuitive ("tensorial") quantities associated with the system, the transformation law does not depend on the precise details of how the coordinates arrived at their final configuration. Spinors, on the other hand, are constructed in such a way that makes them sensitive to how the gradual rotation of the coordinates arrived there: They exhibit path-dependence. It turns out that, for any final configuration of the coordinates, there are actually two ("topologically") inequivalent gradual (continuous) rotations of the coordinate system that result in this same configuration. This ambiguity is called the homotopy class of the gradual rotation. The belt trick puzzle (shown) demonstrates two different rotations, one through an angle of 2 and the other through an angle of 4, having the same final configurations but different classes. Spinors actually exhibit a sign-reversal that genuinely depends on this homotopy class. This distinguishes them from vectors and other tensors, none of which can feel the class.

Spinors can be exhibited as concrete objects using a choice of Cartesian coordinates. In three Euclidean dimensions, for instance, spinors can be constructed by making a choice of Pauli spin matrices corresponding to (angular momenta about) the three coordinate axes. These are 2×2 matrices with complex entries, and the two-component complex column vectors on which these matrices act by matrix multiplication are the spinors. In this case, the spin group is isomorphic to the group of 2×2 unitary matrices with determinant one, which naturally sits inside the matrix algebra. This group acts by conjugation on the real vector space spanned by the Pauli matrices themselves, realizing it as a group of rotations among them, but it also acts on the column vectors (that is, the spinors).

More generally, a Clifford algebra can be constructed from any vector space V equipped with a (nondegenerate) quadratic form, such as Euclidean space with its standard dot product or Minkowski space with its standard Lorentz metric. The space of spinors is the space of column vectors with  components. The orthogonal Lie algebra (i.e., the infinitesimal "rotations") and the spin group associated to the quadratic form are both (canonically) contained in the Clifford algebra, so every Clifford algebra representation also defines a representation of the Lie algebra and the spin group. Depending on the dimension and metric signature, this realization of spinors as column vectors may be irreducible or it may decompose into a pair of so-called "half-spin" or Weyl representations. When the vector space V is four-dimensional, the algebra is described by the gamma matrices.

Mathematical definition 
The space of spinors is formally defined as the fundamental representation of the Clifford algebra. (This may or may not decompose into irreducible representations.) The space of spinors may also be defined as a spin representation of the orthogonal Lie algebra. These spin representations are also characterized as the finite-dimensional projective representations of the special orthogonal group that do not factor through linear representations. Equivalently, a spinor is an element of a finite-dimensional group representation of the spin group on which the center acts non-trivially.

Overview 
There are essentially two frameworks for viewing the notion of a spinor.

From a representation theoretic point of view, one knows beforehand that there are some representations of the Lie algebra of the orthogonal group that cannot be formed by the usual tensor constructions. These missing representations are then labeled the spin representations, and their constituents spinors. All the properties of spinors, and their applications and derived objects, are manifested first in the spin group. Representations of the double covers of these groups yield double-valued projective representations of the groups themselves. (This means that the action of a particular rotation on vectors in the quantum Hilbert space is only defined up to a sign.)

From a geometrical point of view, one can explicitly construct the spinors and then examine how they behave under the action of the relevant Lie groups. This latter approach has the advantage of providing a concrete and elementary description of what a spinor is. However, such a description becomes unwieldy when complicated properties of the spinors, such as Fierz identities, are needed.

Clifford algebras 

The language of Clifford algebras (sometimes called geometric algebras) provides a complete picture of the spin representations of all the spin groups, and the various relationships between those representations, via the classification of Clifford algebras. It largely removes the need for ad hoc constructions.

In detail, let V be a finite-dimensional complex vector space with nondegenerate symmetric bilinear form g. The Clifford algebra  is the algebra generated by V along with the anticommutation relation . It is an abstract version of the algebra generated by the gamma or Pauli matrices. If V = , with the standard form  we denote the Clifford algebra by Cℓn(). Since by the choice of an orthonormal basis every complex vectorspace with non-degenerate form is isomorphic to this standard example, this notation is abused more generally if . If  is even,  is isomorphic as an algebra (in a non-unique way) to the algebra  of  complex matrices (by the Artin–Wedderburn theorem and the easy to prove fact that the Clifford algebra is central simple). If  is odd,  is isomorphic to the algebra  of two copies of the  complex matrices. Therefore, in either case   has a unique (up to isomorphism) irreducible representation (also called simple Clifford module), commonly denoted by Δ, of dimension 2[n/2]. Since the Lie algebra  is embedded as a Lie subalgebra in  equipped with the Clifford algebra commutator as Lie bracket, the space Δ is also a Lie algebra representation of  called a spin representation. If n is odd, this Lie algebra representation is irreducible. If n is even, it splits further into two irreducible representations  called the Weyl or half-spin representations.

Irreducible representations over the reals in the case when V is a real vector space are much more intricate, and the reader is referred to the Clifford algebra article for more details.

Spin groups 

Spinors form a vector space, usually over the complex numbers, equipped with a linear group representation of the spin group that does not factor through a representation of the group of rotations (see diagram). The spin group is the group of rotations keeping track of the homotopy class. Spinors are needed to encode basic information about the topology of the group of rotations because that group is not simply connected, but the simply connected spin group is its double cover. So for every rotation there are two elements of the spin group that represent it. Geometric vectors and other tensors cannot feel the difference between these two elements, but they produce opposite signs when they affect any spinor under the representation. Thinking of the elements of the spin group as homotopy classes of one-parameter families of rotations, each rotation is represented by two distinct homotopy classes of paths to the identity. If a one-parameter family of rotations is visualized as a ribbon in space, with the arc length parameter of that ribbon being the parameter (its tangent, normal, binormal frame actually gives the rotation), then these two distinct homotopy classes are visualized in the two states of the belt trick puzzle (above). The space of spinors is an auxiliary vector space that can be constructed explicitly in coordinates, but ultimately only exists up to isomorphism in that there is no "natural" construction of them that does not rely on arbitrary choices such as coordinate systems. A notion of spinors can be associated, as such an auxiliary mathematical object, with any vector space equipped with a quadratic form such as Euclidean space with its standard dot product, or Minkowski space with its Lorentz metric. In the latter case, the "rotations" include the Lorentz boosts, but otherwise the theory is substantially similar.

Spinor fields in physics 
The constructions given above, in terms of Clifford algebra or representation theory, can be thought of as defining spinors as geometric objects in zero-dimensional space-time. To obtain the spinors of physics, such as the Dirac spinor, one extends the construction to obtain a spin structure on 4-dimensional space-time (Minkowski space). Effectively, one starts with the tangent manifold of space-time, each point of which is a 4-dimensional vector space with SO(3,1) symmetry, and then builds the spin group at each point. The neighborhoods of points are endowed with concepts of smoothness and differentiability: the standard construction is one of a fibre bundle, the fibers of which are affine spaces transforming under the spin group. After constructing the fiber bundle, one may then consider differential equations, such as the Dirac equation, or the Weyl equation on the fiber bundle. These equations (Dirac or Weyl) have solutions that are plane waves, having symmetries characteristic of the fibers, i.e. having the symmetries of spinors, as obtained from the (zero-dimensional) Clifford algebra/spin representation theory described above. Such plane-wave solutions (or other solutions) of the differential equations can then properly be called fermions; fermions have the algebraic qualities of spinors. By general convention, the terms "fermion" and "spinor" are often used interchangeably in physics, as synonyms of one-another.

It appears that all fundamental particles in nature that are spin-1/2 are described by the Dirac equation, with the possible exception of the neutrino. There does not seem to be any a priori reason why this would be the case. There also does not seem to be any particular prohibition to having Weyl spinors appear in nature as fundamental particles.

The Dirac, Weyl, and Majorana spinors are interrelated, and their relation can be elucidated on the basis of real geometric algebra. Dirac and Weyl spinors are complex representations while Majorana spinors are real representations.

Weyl spinors are insufficient to describe massive particles, such as electrons, since the Weyl plane-wave solutions necessarily travel at the speed of light; for massive particles, the Dirac equation is needed. The initial construction of the Standard Model of particle physics starts with both the electron and the neutrino as massless Weyl spinors; the Higgs mechanism gives electrons a mass; the classical neutrino remained massless, and was thus an example of a Weyl spinor. However, because of observed neutrino oscillation, it is now believed that they are not Weyl spinors, but perhaps instead Majorana spinors. It is not known whether Weyl spinor fundamental particles exist in nature.

The situation for condensed matter physics is different: one can construct two and three-dimensional "spacetimes" in a large variety of different physical materials, ranging from semiconductors to far more exotic materials. In 2015, an international team led by Princeton University scientists announced that they had found a quasiparticle that behaves as a Weyl fermion.

Spinors in representation theory 

One major mathematical application of the construction of spinors is to make possible the explicit construction of linear representations of the Lie algebras of the special orthogonal groups, and consequently spinor representations of the groups themselves. At a more profound level, spinors have been found to be at the heart of approaches to the Atiyah–Singer index theorem, and to provide constructions in particular for discrete series representations of semisimple groups.

The spin representations of the special orthogonal Lie algebras are distinguished from the tensor representations given by Weyl's construction by the weights. Whereas the weights of the tensor representations are integer linear combinations of the roots of the Lie algebra, those of the spin representations are half-integer linear combinations thereof. Explicit details can be found in the spin representation article.

Attempts at intuitive understanding 
The spinor can be described, in simple terms, as "vectors of a space the transformations of which are related in a particular way to rotations in physical space". Stated differently:

Several ways of illustrating everyday analogies have been formulated in terms of the plate trick, tangloids and other examples of orientation entanglement.

Nonetheless, the concept is generally considered notoriously difficult to understand, as illustrated by Michael Atiyah's statement that is recounted by Dirac's biographer Graham Farmelo:

History 
The most general mathematical form of spinors was discovered by Élie Cartan in 1913. The word "spinor" was coined by Paul Ehrenfest in his work on quantum physics.

Spinors were first applied to mathematical physics by Wolfgang Pauli in 1927, when he introduced his spin matrices. The following year, Paul Dirac discovered the fully relativistic theory of electron spin by showing the connection between spinors and the Lorentz group. By the 1930s, Dirac, Piet Hein and others at the Niels Bohr Institute (then known as the Institute for Theoretical Physics of the University of Copenhagen) created toys such as Tangloids to teach and model the calculus of spinors.

Spinor spaces were represented as left ideals of a matrix algebra in 1930, by G. Juvet and by Fritz Sauter. More specifically, instead of representing spinors as complex-valued 2D column vectors as Pauli had done, they represented them as complex-valued 2 × 2 matrices in which only the elements of the left column are non-zero.

In 1947 Marcel Riesz constructed spinor spaces as elements of a minimal left ideal of Clifford algebras. In 1966/1967, David Hestenes replaced spinor spaces by the even subalgebra Cℓ01,3() of the spacetime algebra Cℓ1,3(). As of the 1980s, the theoretical physics group at Birkbeck College around David Bohm and Basil Hiley has been developing algebraic approaches to quantum theory that build on Sauter and Riesz' identification of spinors with minimal left ideals.

Examples 
Some simple examples of spinors in low dimensions arise from considering the even-graded subalgebras of the Clifford algebra . This is an algebra built up from an orthonormal basis of  mutually orthogonal vectors under addition and multiplication, p of which have norm +1 and q of which have norm −1, with the product rule for the basis vectors

Two dimensions 
The Clifford algebra Cℓ2,0() is built up from a basis of one unit scalar, 1, two orthogonal unit vectors, σ1 and σ2, and one unit pseudoscalar .

The even subalgebra Cℓ02,0(), spanned by even-graded basis elements of Cℓ2,0(), determines the space of spinors via its representations. It is made up of real linear combinations of 1 and σ1σ2. As a real algebra, Cℓ02,0() is isomorphic to the field of complex numbers . As a result, it admits a conjugation operation (analogous to complex conjugation), sometimes called the reverse of a Clifford element, defined by

which, by the Clifford relations, can be written

The action of an even Clifford element  on vectors, regarded as 1-graded elements of Cℓ2,0(), is determined by mapping a general vector  to the vector

In this situation, a spinor is an ordinary complex number.

An important feature of this definition is the distinction between ordinary vectors and spinors, manifested in how the even-graded elements act on each of them in different ways. In general, a quick check of the Clifford relations reveals that even-graded elements conjugate-commute with ordinary vectors:

Consider, for example, the implication this has for plane rotations. In general, because of logarithmic branching, it is impossible to choose a sign in a consistent way. Thus the representation of plane rotations on spinors is two-valued.

In applications of spinors in two dimensions, it is common to exploit the fact that the algebra of even-graded elements (that is just the ring of complex numbers) is identical to the space of spinors. So, by abuse of language, the two are often conflated. One may then talk about "the action of a spinor on a vector". In a general setting, such statements are meaningless. But in dimensions 2 and 3 (as applied, for example, to computer graphics) they make sense.

Examples

 The even-graded element  corresponds to a vector rotation of 90° from σ1 around towards σ2, which can be checked by confirming that  It corresponds to a spinor rotation of only 45°, however: 
 Similarly the even-graded element  corresponds to a vector rotation of 180°:  but a spinor rotation of only 90°:
 Continuing on further, the even-graded element  corresponds to a vector rotation of 360°:  but a spinor rotation of 180°.

Three dimensions 

The Clifford algebra Cℓ3,0() is built up from a basis of one unit scalar, 1, three orthogonal unit vectors, σ1, σ2 and σ3, the three unit bivectors σ1σ2, σ2σ3, σ3σ1 and the pseudoscalar .

The sub-algebra of even-graded elements is made up of scalar dilations,

and vector rotations

where

corresponds to a vector rotation through an angle θ about an axis defined by a unit vector .

As a special case, it is easy to see that, if , this reproduces the σ1σ2 rotation considered in the previous section; and that such rotation leaves the coefficients of vectors in the σ3 direction invariant, since

The bivectors σ2σ3, σ3σ1 and σ1σ2 are in fact Hamilton's quaternions i, j, and k, discovered in 1843:

With the identification of the even-graded elements with the algebra  of quaternions, as in the case of two dimensions the only representation of the algebra of even-graded elements is on itself. Thus the (real) spinors in three-dimensions are quaternions, and the action of an even-graded element on a spinor is given by ordinary quaternionic multiplication.

Note that the expression (1) for a vector rotation through an angle , the angle appearing in γ was halved. Thus the spinor rotation  (ordinary quaternionic multiplication) will rotate the spinor  through an angle one-half the measure of the angle of the corresponding vector rotation.

The spinor/quaternion representation of rotations in 3D is becoming increasingly prevalent in computer geometry and other applications, because of the notable brevity of the corresponding spin matrix, and the simplicity with which they can be multiplied together to calculate the combined effect of successive rotations about different axes.

Explicit constructions 

A space of spinors can be constructed explicitly with concrete and abstract constructions. The
equivalence of these constructions is a consequence of the uniqueness of the spinor representation of the complex Clifford algebra. For a complete example in dimension 3, see spinors in three dimensions.

Component spinors 

Given a vector space V and a quadratic form g an explicit matrix representation of the Clifford algebra  can be defined as follows. Let . Fix a set of  matrices  such that  (i.e. fix a convention for the gamma matrices). Then the assignment  extends uniquely to an algebra homomorphism  by sending the monomial  in the Clifford algebra to the product  of matrices and extending linearly. The space  on which the gamma matrices act is now a space of spinors. One needs to construct such matrices explicitly, however. In dimension 3, defining the gamma matrices to be the Pauli sigma matrices gives rise to the familiar two component spinors used in non relativistic quantum mechanics. Likewise using the  Dirac gamma matrices gives rise to the 4 component Dirac spinors used in 3+1 dimensional relativistic quantum field theory. In general, in order to define gamma matrices of the required kind, one can use the Weyl–Brauer matrices.

In this construction the representation of the Clifford algebra , the Lie algebra , and the Spin group , all depend on the choice of the orthonormal basis and the choice of the gamma matrices. This can cause confusion over conventions, but invariants like traces are independent of choices. In particular, all physically observable quantities must be independent of such choices. In this construction a spinor can be represented as a vector of 2k complex numbers and is denoted with spinor indices (usually α, β, γ). In the physics literature, such indices are often used to denote spinors even when an abstract spinor construction is used.

Abstract spinors 
There are at least two different, but essentially equivalent, ways to define spinors abstractly. There are two variations on this theme: one can either find a primitive element  that is a nilpotent element of the Clifford algebra, or one that is an idempotent. The construction via nilpotent elements is more fundamental in the sense that an idempotent may then be produced from it. In this way, the spinor representations are identified with certain subspaces of the Clifford algebra itself.

In either approach, the fundamental notion is that of an isotropic subspace . Each construction depends on an initial freedom in choosing this subspace.

As above, we let  be an -dimensional complex vector space equipped with a nondegenerate bilinear form. Let  be a maximal isotropic subspace, i.e. a maximal subspace of  such that . In both the even- and odd-dimensional cases  and  have dimension . In the odd-dimensional case,  is one-dimensional, spanned by a unit vector .

Minimal ideals 
Since W is isotropic, multiplication of elements of W inside  is skew. Let ω be a generator of Wk. In terms of a basis  of in W, one possibility is to set

Note that  (i.e., ω is nilpotent of order 2), and moreover,  for all . The following facts can be proven easily:
 If , then the left ideal  is a minimal left ideal.
 If , then the action of the unit vector u on the left ideal  decomposes the space into a pair of isomorphic irreducible eigenspaces (both denoted by Δ), corresponding to the respective eigenvalues +1 and −1.

In detail, suppose for instance that n is even.

Fix a basis wi of W and a complementary basis wi′ of W so that

Note that any element of I must have the form αω, by virtue of our assumption that . Let  be any such element. Using the chosen basis, we may write

where the ai1...ip are scalars, and the Bj are auxiliary elements of the Clifford algebra. Observe now that the product

Pick any nonzero monomial a in the expansion of α with maximal homogeneous degree in the elements wi:
 (no summation implied),
then

is a nonzero scalar multiple of ω, as required.

Note that for n even, this computation also shows that

as a vector space. In the last equality we again used that W is isotropic. In physics terms, this shows that Δ is built up like a Fock space by creating spinors using anti-commuting creation operators in W acting on a vacuum ω.

Exterior algebra construction 
The computations with the minimal ideal construction suggest that a spinor representation can
also be defined directly using the exterior algebra  of the isotropic subspace W.
Let  denote the exterior algebra of W considered as vector space only. This will be the spin representation, and its elements will be referred to as spinors.

The action of the Clifford algebra on Δ is defined first by giving the action of an element of V on Δ, and then showing that this action respects the Clifford relation and so extends to a homomorphism of the full Clifford algebra into the endomorphism ring End(Δ) by the universal property of Clifford algebras. The details differ slightly according to whether the dimension of V is even or odd.

When dim() is even,  where W is the chosen isotropic complement.

where i(w) is interior product with w using the nondegenerate quadratic form to identify V with V∗, and ε(w) denotes the exterior product. This action is sometimes called the Clifford product. It may be verified that

and so  respects the Clifford relations and extends to a homomorphism from the Clifford algebra to End(Δ).

The spin representation Δ further decomposes into a pair of irreducible complex representations of the Spin group (the half-spin representations, or Weyl spinors) via

As before, one verifies that c respects the Clifford relations, and so induces a homomorphism.

Hermitian vector spaces and spinors 
If the vector space V has extra structure that provides a decomposition of its complexification into two maximal isotropic subspaces, then the definition of spinors (by either method) becomes natural.

The main example is the case that the real vector space V is a hermitian vector space , i.e., V is equipped with a complex structure J that is an orthogonal transformation with respect to the inner product g on V. Then  splits in the  eigenspaces of J. These eigenspaces are isotropic for the complexification of g and can be identified with the complex vector space  and its complex conjugate . Therefore, for a hermitian vector space  the vector space  (as well as its complex conjugate  is a spinor space for the underlying real euclidean vector space.

With the Clifford action as above but with contraction using the hermitian form, this construction gives a spinor space at every point of an almost Hermitian manifold and is the reason why every almost complex manifold (in particular every symplectic manifold) has a Spinc structure. Likewise, every complex vector bundle on a manifold carries a Spinc structure.

Clebsch–Gordan decomposition 
A number of Clebsch–Gordan decompositions are possible on the tensor product of one spin representation with another. These decompositions express the tensor product in terms of the alternating representations of the orthogonal group.

For the real or complex case, the alternating representations are
 , the representation of the orthogonal group on skew tensors of rank r.

In addition, for the real orthogonal groups, there are three characters (one-dimensional representations)
 σ = σ+σ− . (The orientation character.)

The Clebsch–Gordan decomposition allows one to define, among other things:
 An action of spinors on vectors.
 A Hermitian metric on the complex representations of the real spin groups.
 A Dirac operator on each spin representation.

Even dimensions 
If  is even, then the tensor product of Δ with the contragredient representation decomposes as

which can be seen explicitly by considering (in the Explicit construction) the action of the Clifford algebra on decomposable elements . The rightmost formulation follows from the transformation properties of the Hodge star operator. Note that on restriction to the even Clifford algebra, the paired summands  are isomorphic, but under the full Clifford algebra they are not.

There is a natural identification of Δ with its contragredient representation via the conjugation in the Clifford algebra:

So  also decomposes in the above manner. Furthermore, under the even Clifford algebra, the half-spin representations decompose

For the complex representations of the real Clifford algebras, the associated reality structure on the complex Clifford algebra descends to the space of spinors (via the explicit construction in terms of minimal ideals, for instance). In this way, we obtain the complex conjugate  of the representation Δ, and the following isomorphism is seen to hold:

In particular, note that the representation Δ of the orthochronous spin group is a unitary representation. In general, there are Clebsch–Gordan decompositions

In metric signature , the following isomorphisms hold for the conjugate half-spin representations
 If q is even, then  and 
 If q is odd, then  and 
Using these isomorphisms, one can deduce analogous decompositions for the tensor products of the half-spin representations .

Odd dimensions 
If  is odd, then

In the real case, once again the isomorphism holds

Hence there is a Clebsch–Gordan decomposition (again using the Hodge star to dualize) given by

Consequences 
There are many far-reaching consequences of the Clebsch–Gordan decompositions of the spinor spaces. The most fundamental of these pertain to Dirac's theory of the electron, among whose basic requirements are
 A manner of regarding the product of two spinors ψ as a scalar. In physical terms, a spinor should determine a probability amplitude for the quantum state.
 A manner of regarding the product ψ as a vector. This is an essential feature of Dirac's theory, which ties the spinor formalism to the geometry of physical space.
 A manner of regarding a spinor as acting upon a vector, by an expression such as ψv. In physical terms, this represents an electric current of Maxwell's electromagnetic theory, or more generally a probability current.

Summary in low dimensions 
 In 1 dimension (a trivial example), the single spinor representation is formally Majorana, a real 1-dimensional representation that does not transform.
 In 2 Euclidean dimensions, the left-handed and the right-handed Weyl spinor are 1-component complex representations, i.e. complex numbers that get multiplied by e±iφ/2 under a rotation by angle φ.
 In 3 Euclidean dimensions, the single spinor representation is 2-dimensional and quaternionic. The existence of spinors in 3 dimensions follows from the isomorphism of the groups  that allows us to define the action of Spin(3) on a complex 2-component column (a spinor); the generators of SU(2) can be written as Pauli matrices.
There are two inequivalent quaternionic 2-component Weyl spinors and each of them transforms under one of the SU(2) factors only.
 In 5 Euclidean dimensions, the relevant isomorphism is  that implies that the single spinor representation is 4-dimensional and quaternionic.
 In 6 Euclidean dimensions, the isomorphism  guarantees that there are two 4-dimensional complex Weyl representations that are complex conjugates of one another.
 In 7 Euclidean dimensions, the single spinor representation is 8-dimensional and real; no isomorphisms to a Lie algebra from another series (A or C) exist from this dimension on.
 In 8 Euclidean dimensions, there are two Weyl–Majorana real 8-dimensional representations that are related to the 8-dimensional real vector representation by a special property of Spin(8) called triality.
 In  dimensions, the number of distinct irreducible spinor representations and their reality (whether they are real, pseudoreal, or complex) mimics the structure in d dimensions, but their dimensions are 16 times larger; this allows one to understand all remaining cases. See Bott periodicity.
 In spacetimes with p spatial and q time-like directions, the dimensions viewed as dimensions over the complex numbers coincide with the case of the -dimensional Euclidean space, but the reality projections mimic the structure in  Euclidean dimensions. For example, in  dimensions there are two non-equivalent Weyl complex (like in 2 dimensions) 2-component (like in 4 dimensions) spinors, which follows from the isomorphism .

See also 

 Anyon
 Dirac equation in the algebra of physical space
 Eigenspinor
 Einstein–Cartan theory
 Projective representation
 Pure spinor
 Spin-1/2
 Spinor bundle
 Supercharge
 Twistor theory

Notes

References

Further reading 
 
 
 
 
 
 
 
 
 
 
 
 
 

 
Rotation in three dimensions
Quantum mechanics
Quantum field theory